The Carshalton by-election of 11 March 1976 was held after the Conservative Member of Parliament (MP) Robert Carr  was elevated to the House of Lords. The Conservatives held on to the seat in the by-election.

Results

References

External links
Biography and election literature of Terry Denville-Faulkner

Carshalton by-election
Carshalton,1976
Carshalton,1976
Carshalton by-election
Carshalton
Carshalton by-election